Admiral Sir Randolph Frank Ollive Foote, KCB, CMG (14 May 1853 – 28 November 1931) was a Royal Navy officer. A gunnery and ordnance specialist, he held several senior appointments in ordnance administration during his career.

The son of Captain John Foote, RN and the grandson of Vice-Admiral Sir Edward James Foote, Randolph Foote joined HMS Britannia as a cadet in April 1867. In 1897, he took part in the Benin Expedition as captain of HMS Forte, and for his service he was mentioned in despatches and appointed a CMG.

In 1916, he was appointed a temporary major in the British Army.

References 

1853 births
1931 deaths
Royal Navy admirals
Knights Commander of the Order of the Bath
Companions of the Order of St Michael and St George
British Army officers
British Army personnel of World War I
British military personnel of the Benin Expedition of 1897